Ezio Damolin (25 December 1944 – 18 March 2022) was an Italian nordic combined skier and ski jumper who competed in the 1960s and 1970s. His best finish at the Winter Olympics was fifth in the Nordic combined event at Grenoble in 1968.

He was born in Moena, Italy.

Damolin's finish was the best for Italy in the Olympic Nordic combined event until Alessandro Pittin won bronze in the 10 km individual normal hill event at the 2010 Winter Olympics in Vancouver.

Further notable results

Nordic combined 
 1964: 2nd, Italian championships of Nordic combined skiing
 1965: 1st, Italian championships of Nordic combined skiing
 1966: 1st, Italian championships of Nordic combined skiing
 1967: 1st, Italian championships of Nordic combined skiing
 1968: 2nd, Italian championships of Nordic combined skiing
 1969: 1st, Italian championships of Nordic combined skiing
 1970: 1st, Italian championships of Nordic combined skiing
 1971: 2nd, Italian championships of Nordic combined skiing
 1972: 1st, Italian championships of Nordic combined skiing
 1973: 1st, Italian championships of Nordic combined skiing
 1976: 2nd, Italian championships of Nordic combined skiing

Ski jumping 
 1968: 1st, Italian championships of ski jumping
 1969: 3rd, Italian championships of ski jumping
 1971: 2nd, Italian championships of ski jumping
 1972: 3rd, Italian championships of ski jumping
 1974: 1st, Italian championships of ski jumping

External links 
 

1944 births
2022 deaths
Italian male Nordic combined skiers
Italian male ski jumpers
Nordic combined skiers at the 1964 Winter Olympics
Nordic combined skiers at the 1968 Winter Olympics
Nordic combined skiers at the 1972 Winter Olympics
Ski jumpers at the 1972 Winter Olympics
Olympic Nordic combined skiers of Italy
Olympic ski jumpers of Italy
Sportspeople from Trentino